Far was an American rock band from Sacramento, California, formed in 1991. Although Far only experienced limited commercial success, the band had considerable influence on underground rock music. They are perhaps best remembered for their rock cover of "Pony", a song originally by Ginuwine, which peaked at #40 on Billboard's Alternative Songs chart in 2009.

History

Original releases (1991–1998) 
After a number of local releases including their first demo tape Sweat A River, Live No Lies (1991) and two independent albums Listening Game (1992) and Quick (1994) the band signed to Epic/Immortal Records and released their first major record. Tin Cans With Strings To You was recorded in September 1995 and released by Epic/Immortal on April 3, 1996. Their manager Troy Davis considers Tin Cans With Strings to be the first-ever screamo album. The song "Job's Eyes" was featured in an episode of Buffy the Vampire Slayer, titled "The Pack", which aired on April 7, 1997.  Around this time, the band were being put on bills with heavier artists, such as Sepultura and Monster Magnet. Vocalist Jonah Matranga later recalled how the band would often get booed and abused by the audience at these shows.

Far's next release was a four-song EP titled Soon (1997), which featured two songs ("Bury White", "Mother Mary") that would later be included on their fourth and most popular album, Water & Solutions (1998). Water & Solutions was recorded in April 1997 and produced by Dave Sardy. It attracted a strong cult following in the late 1990s, due mostly to the single "Mother Mary" and the band touring with longtime friends Deftones, and Incubus. The more melodic sound showcased on this album is increasingly cited as an influence on present-day alternative rock bands by the rock press, i.e.: Thursday, Biffy Clyro, Jimmy Eat World.

Break-up and post-Far activities (1999–2007) 
Since their 1999 split, the former members of Far have been involved in a number of projects, often quite experimental in nature. Frontman Jonah Matranga continued with his solo project Onelinedrawing and formed the now defunct band New End Original (an anagram of Onelinedrawing). Matranga "broke up" Onelinedrawing in August 2004. In 2005 the singer's new band Gratitude released their debut self-titled record on Atlantic Records. Gratitude, however, called it a day towards the end of 2005, playing their last US tour before splitting in December 2005. He now plays music under his own name, with new work as well as music from his previous outings.

Guitarist and founder Shaun Lopez went on to form The Revolution Smile.  The band has released two records and toured around the US and Europe.  He also has his own studio where he has produced such bands as Trigger Point, Giant Drag, The X-Ecutioners, the Deftones fifth record (Saturday Night Wrist) released by Maverick Records and most recently Will Haven´s fourth record The Hierophant.

Bassist John Gutenberger is currently playing in a band with his wife, Caitlin called Two Sheds.

Drummer Chris Robyn has since played several shows with Will Haven in 2000 when their drummer Wayne Morse left. He currently plays in the post-hardcore supergroup Black Map.

Reformation (2009–present) 
In 2008, the band confirmed they will be reforming for a handful of US dates, and also a small UK tour.  Along with the confirmed UK tour, a cover of the track "Pony" by Ginuwine has been posted on the Hot Little Pony myspace.

In October 2008, the band launched the official website at thebandfar.com

On October 21, Live 105 (KITS) (San Francisco) and KWOD 106.5 (Sacramento) added Pony into regular rotation. On November 4, 91x (San Diego) added Pony.  On December 4 KROQ-FM (Los Angeles) added Pony.

On March 2, Vagrant announced that they have signed FAR, and that the band are putting the finishing touches on their fifth studio album, which will be out in 2010.

On October 17, 2009, Far posted studio video part three, which concluded reading "At Night we Live" out in 2010 on Vagrant Records. The name is also the title of a song they wrote for Deftones bass player Chi Cheng, after his car accident in November 2008.

On February 10, 2010, Far announced At Night We Live will be released May 18, 2010, on Vagrant Records. On March 16, Jonah Matranga announced that the album will be pushed back one week to May 25 due to artwork finalizing.

On June 27, 2011, Jonah Matranga went on theFIVE10 Radio and said that it was not likely Far would be getting back together. He cited several problems but mainly that there was just "too much drama."

In November 2012, Jonah Matranga joined hardcore punk band 7 Seconds on-stage at the Ace of Spades in Sacramento, California, performing the song "Satyagraha".

Members 
Jonah Matranga – vocals, guitar
Shaun Lopez – guitar
John Gutenberger – bass
Chris Robyn – drums, percussion

Discography

Studio albums 
Listening Game (1992)
Quick (1994)
Tin Cans with Strings to You (1996)
Water & Solutions (1998)
At Night We Live  (2010)

Extended plays 
Soon (1997)

Singles 
"Pony" (2008) No. 40 US Modern Rock

Promos 
 The System (with E-Bomb snippets) (1998)
 Mother Mary
 Love, American Style
 What I've Wanted to Say
 In the Aisle, Yelling (released on CD and cassette)
 Pony (one-track advance promo 4:23 on Vagrant) (2009)

7"s 
 Far Does Madonna (w/Sea Pigs)
 Boring Life
 Far / Incubus split w/ Water and Solutions
 Far / Incubus / Korn / Urge Split (Far song – In the Aisle Yelling) (1997 promo immortal)
 Far / Incubus Split (Far – mother Mary Incubus – Certain Shade of Green) (1998)
 Pony w/ Pony acoustic (2009)

Demos 
Sweat a River, Live No Lies (1991)

References

External links 
Official Website (archived)
Official Store
Far bios
Official Myspace
Official Hot Little Pony Myspace
Far interview on Rockmidgets.com
Far interview with Submerge Magazine, Dec. 2008
Noisecreep talks to Shaun Lopez

American alternative metal musical groups
Alternative rock groups from California
Epic Records artists
Vagrant Records artists
Musical groups established in 1991
Musical groups disestablished in 1999
Musical groups reestablished in 2008
Musical groups from Sacramento, California
Musical groups disestablished in 2010
1991 establishments in California